The following lists events that happened during 2005 in Jordan.

Incumbents
Monarch: Abdullah II
Prime Minister: 
 until 6 April: Faisal al-Fayez
 6 April-27 November: Adnan Badran 
 starting 27 November: Marouf al-Bakhit

Events

May
 May 27 - Protests have occurred in Jordan after the US military admitted that the Qur'an had been "mishandled" by soldiers.

August
 August 19 - A Jordanian soldier dies when three unexploded Katyusha rockets miss their targets and hit a warehouse and hospital in Aqaba and hit a road by the airport in nearby Eilat, Israel.

November
 November 9 - Three coordinated attacks on the Grand Hyatt Hotel, Radisson SAS Hotel, and Days Inn in the capital of Amman kill at least 57 people and injure 115 others, mostly Westerners. Abu Musab al-Zarqawi later claims responsibility.
 November 13 - Following coordinated bombings in Amman on November 9, Jordanian police arrest a woman said to be the wife of a suicide attacker.

See also
 Years in Iraq
 Years in Syria
 Years in Saudi Arabia

References

 
2000s in Jordan
Jordan
Jordan
Years of the 21st century in Jordan